Edward Prior may refer to:

Edward Gawler Prior (1853–1920), Canadian politician
Edward Schroeder Prior (1857–1932), art professor at Cambridge University

See also
Ted Prior (disambiguation)